The Sky Sword 1, or TC-1, is a short range infrared guided air-to-air missile. The missile has fire and forget slave-by-radar capabilities. It consists of an imaging infrared seeker, a high explosive warhead, a solid propellant motor and a guidance control unit. The seeker uses dual spectral IR and has a detection range of 18.5km. 
The Sky Sword 1 is also used as a surface-to-air missile by the Antelope air defence system.

Development
The Sky Sword 1 was developed in the mid-1980s and revealed in May 1986, as Taiwan's first indigenous air-to-air missile. The production of the missile started in 1991 and the air-to-air version entered ROCAF service in 1993. It bears a striking similarity to the American AIM-9 (also in Taiwanese service) and fulfills a similar role on the Indigenous Defense Fighter to the AIM-9 on the F-16. In 2017 NCSIST exhibited a variant of the TC-1 with a larger diameter motor.

Service history
TC-1 missiles were employed during a 2019 training exercise off Taiwan’s east coast.

Variants

TC-1L

The TC-1L is a ground-launched variant for use with the Antelope air defence system.

Sea TC-1
Developed for use with the Sea Oryx system, the Sea TC-1 variant has an improved seeker, data-link, and rocket motor.

See also
 Republic of China Air Force
 Sky Bow
 Sky Sword II

Similar weapons
 AIM-9 Sidewinder
 RIM-116 Rolling Airframe Missile
 AAM-3
 AAM-5
 R.550 Magic
 MICA
 MAA-1 Piranha
 A-Darter
 Fatter
 R-73
 PL-9
 Python

References

External links
 TC-2 info on Global Security
 TC-2N test video:

Air-to-air missiles of the Republic of China
Surface-to-air missiles of the Republic of China
20th-century surface-to-air missiles
Military equipment introduced in the 1980s